Flippin   is an unincorporated community  located in Monroe County, Kentucky, United States.  A small residential village and community surround the intersections of Kentucky Route 249, Kentucky Route 678, and Kentucky Route 100, approximately 3.6 miles (5.8 km) south of the Monroe-Barren County line, where the South Fork and main stream of Indian Creek converge.

History

This locale was originally identified as the “forks of Indian Creek” and later known as “Pikesville,” which was established as a town here by Barren County (Kentucky) Court in August, 1818. The name, “Flippin,” was first used to avoid confusion with “Pikeville,” county seat of Pike County, Kentucky, when a post office was permanently established here in 1858. Flippin’s post office was discontinued in 1964.

Notes

References

External links
 
  Pikesville Historical Marker at  HMdb.org
 Daniel Boone Was Here Historical Marker at  HMdb.org
  Famous Tree Historical Marker (Correction: "In 1893") at   HMdb.org
 Camp Anderson Historical Marker at  HMdb.org

Unincorporated communities in Monroe County, Kentucky
Unincorporated communities in Kentucky